Hunt's Island is an abandoned fishing settlement in the District of Burgeo-La Poile, on the south west coast of Newfoundland, Canada.  It was settled in the 1830s and resettled in 1963.   In 1911, its population peaked at 244.  This declined to 175 in 1921, rebounded to 178 in 1935, and declined again to 132 in 1945, the last year in was listed separately in the census.  Hunt's Island is located in census division 3, subdivision F.

See also
 List of communities in Newfoundland and Labrador
 List of ghost towns in Newfoundland and Labrador
 List of islands of Newfoundland and Labrador
 Burgeo-La Poile

References

Ghost towns in Newfoundland and Labrador
Uninhabited islands of Newfoundland and Labrador